Jarząbkowice may refer to the following places in Poland:
Jarząbkowice, Lower Silesian Voivodeship (south-west Poland)
Jarząbkowice, Silesian Voivodeship (south Poland)